Gloss may refer to:

Text
Gloss (annotation), an explanatory note in a text, such as:
Interlinear gloss, in linguistics and pedagogy
Biblical gloss
Glose or Gloss, a quatrain from a usually better known poem incorporated into a new poem

Shininess
Gloss (optics), reflectivity of light on a surface
Gloss and matte paint, terms used for painted finishes
Lip gloss
Sickle-gloss, a silica residue found on blades

Fiction
Gloss (character), a fictional character who appeared in DC Comics' series New Guardians
Gloss (film), a Russian satirical melodrama by Andrei Konchalovsky
Gloss (TV series), a New Zealand television drama, which ran from 1987 to 1990
Gloss, a minor character in The Hunger Games

People
Hugo Gloss (born 1985), Brazilian journalist and presenter
Molly Gloss (born 1944), American writer

Other uses
Dillon v. Gloss, a 1921 U.S. constitutional court case
Global Sea Level Observing System, an Intergovernmental Oceanographic Commission program
G.L.O.S.S., a punk band based in Olympia, Washington
GLOSS FM, an online radio station based in South Gloucestershire, UK

See also
Glossa (disambiguation)